Williamson Bluff is a flat-topped bluff more than  high near the head of Trail Inlet on the east coast of Graham Land. The upper part of the bluff is snow topped, but the sides are steep and rocky. First photographed from aircraft by personnel of United States Antarctic Service (USAS) on a flight of September 28, 1940. Named by United Kingdom Antarctic Place-Names Committee (UK-APC) after the Rev. William Williamson (1804–75), British mathematician and lawyer who made one of the earliest measurements of the surface flow of a glacier, in Switzerland, 1844.

Cliffs of Graham Land
Bowman Coast